The Kennett City Hall and Masonic Lodge, is a historic building located at Kennett, Dunklin County, Missouri, USA. It has also been known as the Dunklin County Museum.  As originally constructed in 1903, the first floor was used exclusively as Kennett's City Hall and the second floor was occupied by several local Masonic organizations. The Masons moved to a new building in the 1950s, and in 1976 the city vacated the premises as well. 

In 2013, the building was housing the Dunklin County Museum, an historical museum for the county.

It was listed on the National Register of Historic Places in 1981.

References

External links
 Dunklin County Museums -  Bootheel Regional Planning and Economic Development Commission
 Museums USA listing for Dunklin County Museum

Clubhouses on the National Register of Historic Places in Missouri
Government buildings on the National Register of Historic Places in Missouri
Government buildings completed in 1903
Masonic buildings completed in 1903
City halls in Missouri
Former Masonic buildings in Missouri
Museums in Dunklin County, Missouri
History museums in Missouri
Buildings and structures in Dunklin County, Missouri
National Register of Historic Places in Dunklin County, Missouri